"Up Around the Bend" is a song by American rock band Creedence Clearwater Revival, written by the band's frontman John Fogerty. The song was composed and recorded only a few days prior to the band's April 1970 European tour and was included on the album Cosmo's Factory. Released as a single, with "Run Through the Jungle" on the flipside, the double-sided single climbed to number four on the Billboard Hot 100 chart in the spring of 1970.

It was certified gold by the RIAA for sales of over one million copies. It was also a major hit in the UK, where it reached number three on the UK Singles Chart.

The song opens with a prominent, high-pitched guitar riff played by John Fogerty. The song's lyrics have Fogerty telling of a gathering "up around the bend" on the highway and inviting the listener to join in.

Cash Box described the song as a "powerfully sung and played bit of rock with excellent top forty drive."

The song has been covered by artists such as Elton John, who recorded a version of the song early in his career, and Finnish rock band Hanoi Rocks, who covered it on their 1984 album, Two Steps from the Move.

Charts

Certifications

In popular culture

"Up Around the Bend" has appeared in the following films: Eau froide, L' (1994), Michael (1996), Remember the Titans (2000), Invincible (2006), The Hoax (2007), Red Dawn (2012), and Free Birds (2013). It was also used in the TV mini-series, From the Earth to the Moon (1998), the last episode of The Wonder Years, and in the first episode of Hap and Leonard (2016).

The song was featured in the Kurt Cobain documentary Kurt Cobain About a Son and is also available on its soundtrack.

Atlanta-based radio host Kim Peterson used the guitar riff from the song's intro as part of his 1990s WGST afternoon drive-time talk show's theme song/bumper music, often with Peterson mimicking a Marine Corps drill sergeant‘s cadence call over the music.

Finnish rock and glam punk band Hanoi Rocks covered "Up Around the Bend" on their fifth studio album Two Steps from the Move. The song was also released as a single.

The song was frequently used by Pete Buttigieg at events in his campaign for the 2020 presidential election before he suspended it on March 1. Apart from the choice of the song possibly being intended to allude to Buttigieg's position as mayor of South Bend, Indiana, Buttigieg recalled in his 2019 book, Shortest Way Home, that as a teenager, "We might talk, or not, as we crossed the state line, either in Mom's giant blue Buick LeSabre listening to NPR news, or Dad's two-door Chevy Cavalier listening to what might have been his sole cassette, the Creedence Clearwater Revival masterpiece Cosmo’s Factory, looping permanently in the tape player for about as long [as] he owned the car."

References

1970 songs
1984 singles
CBS Records singles
Columbia Records singles
Creedence Clearwater Revival songs
Fantasy Records singles
Hanoi Rocks songs
Number-one singles in Australia
Relativity Records singles
Song recordings produced by Bob Ezrin
Song recordings produced by John Fogerty
Songs written by John Fogerty
RPM Top Singles number-one singles